Kotev Cove (‘Kotev Zaliv’ \'ko-tev 'za-liv\) is the 1.81 km wide cove indenting for 1.8 km the northeast coast of Two Hummock Island in the Palmer Archipelago, Antarctica.  It is entered northwest of Butrointsi Point.

The cove is named after Vasil Kotev, commander motor boats and sledges at St. Kliment Ohridski base in 2007/08 and subsequent seasons, and base commander during parts of the 2009/10 and 2011/12 seasons.

Location
British mapping in 1978.

Maps
 British Antarctic Territory.  Scale 1:200000 topographic map.  DOS 610 Series, Sheet W 64 60.  Directorate of Overseas Surveys, UK, 1978.
 Antarctic Digital Database (ADD). Scale 1:250000 topographic map of Antarctica. Scientific Committee on Antarctic Research (SCAR). Since 1993, regularly upgraded and updated.

References
 Bulgarian Antarctic Gazetteer. Antarctic Place-names Commission. (details in Bulgarian, basic data in English)
 Kotev Cove. SCAR Composite Antarctic Gazetteer.

External links
 Kotev Cove. Copernix satellite image

Two Hummock Island
Coves of Graham Land
Bulgaria and the Antarctic